Zhang Jie (又名阿杰, born November 27, 1978), also known as Jet and Ketsu, is a mainland Chinese voice actor.

Because he and Bian Jiang, and two female voice actors, Qiao Shiyu and Ji Guanlin, have combined to be the voices of many popular TV dramas, the citizens have joked that Chinese TV dramas are all four of them falling in love.

Dubbing

Film and television work

TV shows 
2007
 Love Law Kim Jong-ho (Jin Zhengxun)
2008
 The Legend of Bruce Lee (character "Blair", originally Ted Durham)
 鸳鸯河 Wei Weiqing (Xie Junhao)
 A Thousand Drops of Tears Lin Boya (Xu Yufeng)
 Rose Martial World (Chen Jianfeng)
2009
 Prelude of Lotus Lantern (Yu Jia)
 The Peacock Flies to the Southeast Jiao Zhongqing (Pan Yueming)
 The Firmament of The Pleiades Shun Gui (Zhou Chun ornaments), Lan Qin (Li Yanming ornaments), Chen Lianyuan
 Golden Taipan Sheng Yueru (Zhou Yimin)
 The Sharpshooter Director Liu (Jiang Changyi)
2010
 Happy Mother-in-Law, Pretty Daughter-in-Law (高昊)
 Spring Glory Pig Nine Sisters Fest / Fei Ge (Liu Xiaofeng)
 Spell of the Fragrance Xiang Haoze (Gao Wei Decoration)
 It's better to dance Luo Peng (Zhong Hanliang)
 Too Late to Say I Love You Murong Yu (Zhong Hanliang)
 Beauty's Rival in Palace (Luo Jin) Nie Feng (Huang Haibing)
 Pretty Maid Xiao Qingyu (Chen Sicheng)
 Men's Beauty 2 Zhang Weiqi (An Qi Xuan)
 Emperor of the "Angry Sea Ambition" (also known as the sea vying, big voyage II)
2011
 Tibetan Heart Zhou Tianyi (Luo Jin ornaments)
 Empresses in the Palace Wen Shichu (Zhang Xiaolong)
 Journey to the West (Zhang Jizhong version) Wuji Guotaizi
 Sealed with a Kiss Mu Zhenfei (Zhao Chulun)
 The Heaven and Earth Marriage Seven Fairies Fire Dragon / Shen Rui (Zhao Hongfei)
 Love Wakes Up Ji Rufeng (Xu Zhengyi)
 All Men Are Brothers Hua Rong (Zhang Di ornaments)
 Beauty World Ming Chongzhen / Mingyi (Mingdao Decoration)
 My Daughter Yan Liheng (Xu Zhengyi)
 Palace Yin Reng (cases Fengyan ornaments) 14 princes Yin Chen (Mao Zijun ornaments)
 Melody of Youth Wang Yuhang (Gu Juji)
2012
 Desperate Love Yonghe (Tian Jiada)
 The Most Beautiful Time Lu Licheng (Zhong Hanliang)
 The Magic Blade Fu Hongxue (Zhong Hanliang)
 Ia Ia, I Do Xie Chaoqun (Xu Yue)
 Fairytale Jing Wei (Zhu Wei)
 Women of the Tang Dynasty Li Longji (Li Chengyu)
 Allure Snow Hang Jingfeng (Gao Wei Decoration)
 Dear, Go Home An Yakang (Luo Dahua)
 A Beauty in Troubled Times He Tian (Chen Jianfeng)
 Bounty Hunter An Hi Yuan (Qian Yongchen)
 A Touch Yang Muchu (Zhong Hanliang)
 Palace II Li Wei (Wang Yang ornaments)
2013
 Legend of Lu Zhen (Chen Xiao ornaments)
 The Legend of Chasing Fish Zhao Duan (Ding Zijun)
 Flowers in Fog Qi Fei (Zhang Rui ornaments)
2014
 The Dream Liuwen Zhao (Wang Yang ornaments)
 古剑奇谭 Baili Tusu (Li Yifeng)
2015
 Four young names is ruthless (Yang Yang ornaments)
 琅琊榜 listed in the battle of Ying (Zhang Yujian) Zhuo Qingyao (Jie Jie ornaments)
 I never thought of the third season Wu Qiling (Li Yuan ornaments)
 New Border Town Prodigal Son Fu Hongxue (Zhu Yilong)
2016
 Old Nine Gates Qi Tiezui (Ying Yu)
 Su dyeing and chasing husband Xiao Muchen (Teng Fei ornaments)
 Flying Knife and Flying Knife Li Zheng (Huang Ming ornaments)
 Qing Yunzhi Zhang Xiaofan, Ghost Li (Li Yifeng)
 Kyushu Sky City Wind Blade (Zhao Jian)
 Boiled Women's Detective Mao Ruyi (Jia Nailiang)
 Taiji Master Taiji Gate Chen Rufeng (Ying Yi)
 Lonely Empty Court Spring Desire Chang Qing (Zhang Xiaochen)
 Beauty for the stuffing Xu Sibai (Li Geng)
2017
 School Flower Prequel: Very Pure and Ambiguous Li Boliang (Chen Bairong)
 Eternal Love Donghua Emperor (Gao Weiguang)
 The Glory of Tang Dynasty (Ren Jialun)
 Please! Don't black me! Blue One Whale (Huang Yuqi)
 Lost Love in Times Yuan Zhan (Xu Haiqiao)"
 Soul Street, Cao Yubing (Wang Dongcheng)
 Tong Tian Di Ren Jie (Ren Jialun)
 The Legend of the Phoenix of Heaven, Gu Qinghong (Zhang Xiaolong)
 Guo Shi Wushuang Huang Feihong Ai Xinjue Luo, Zai Yu (Jing Chao)
 The moment of the heart, Yao Yiming (Li Xiangtai)
2018
 Untouchable Lovers: Wang Yizhi (Zhang Xinyu)
 The Legend of Dugu: Yang Jian (Zhang Danfeng)
 The Destiny of the White Snake: Xu Xuan / Zi Xuan (Ren Jialun)
 Never Gone: Xu Zhiheng (Archie Kao)
 Cinderella Chef: Xia Chunyu (Xu Zhixian)
2019
 Under the Power 陸繹（任嘉伦 饰）
2020
 Love and Redemption (Yu Sifeng)
2021
 Ancient Love Poetry2022
 The Blue Whisper Immortal Samsara''

Animation 
 Case Closed, theatrical version of Detective Conan, "The Sunflower of the Fire" Kudo Shinichi, Kaitou Kid
 《风花仙子传传》 Yang Han Lin
 Detective Conan Theatrical Edition "15 minutes of silence" Kudo Shinichi, Ryuhara Winter Horse
 Fox Demon Little Matchmaker 
 The first animated MV of Kamon's Seven Poems : Sai Ann
 《侠岚》(千钧)
 Star Travel (Harley's predecessor Miron is currently Mirona)
 Confucius (Children's Channel)
 Dragon Billiards (Fan Hai Lan)
 Garfield 's happy life (mainland release version)
 Han and Han Dynasties (Zhang Wei)
 Magic Detective (Huo Xing, Dorothy)
 Four Eyes Chicken (Little Chicken) CCTV6
 Green Fruit Campus 
 Detective Conan Theatrical Edition "The Dark Tracker " (Kudo Shinichi)
 The Romance of the Three Kingdoms (Zhao Yun , Wei Yan , Li Su , Liu Zen, etc.)
 Frog Guns DVD Edition (GIRORO)
 Lightning Dog public version
 Disney Animation " Peter Pan " Movie Channel (Peter Pan)
 憨八龟 (百丈跳)
 Funny Collection Club (Luo Zhongtian)
 Robotech Shadow Chronicles · DVD edition
 Wonderful immortal child movie channel
 Horton and Anonymous DVD Edition
 Little War Elephant (public version), etc.
 100,000 Jokes The End of the World
 The King's Avatar - 全職高手 (YeXiu/YeQiu)
 My master's brother has a pit in his mind 
 Please Take My Brother Away! - 萬歲 (Wan Sui)
 Mo Dao Zu Shi / Grandmaster of Demonic Cultivation - 魔道祖师  (Wei WuXian/WeiYing, Mo XuanYu)
 No Doubt In Us (Xiao Jingyun)

Films
 Moore Manor Ice Age Nick
 Narrator of Paris Baby
 The One Hundred Thousand Fires (Karachok Pan)
 Raisins under the Sun (CCTV-6)
 FireWire, Zhong Lang (Zhong Hanliang)
 Let's get married (CCTV-6)
 Spicy Baby (Neil) (CCTV-6)
 Cinderella (CCTV-6)
 High School Musical 3 (CCTV-6)
 Stolen Days (CCTV-6)
 Alice in Wonderland (sea Mississippi)
 Extreme Space (珈罗瓦/阿雷胡·苏拉斯饰)
 Life Remote Control (Mike Newman / Adam Sandler
 Terminator 4 (Karl Rees / Blair Williams)
 The Rise of the Special Forces Cobra (White Ghost / Lee Byung Hun, Cobra Commander) 
 Fengyun 2 (Desperate / Nicholas Tse)
 The Last Road Thunder (Argonne)
 2012 (Indian scientist, Lama, etc.)
 Action Target Hitler
 Lonely Man
 Transformers 
 Australian chaos
 Max Payne DVD
 Gone with the Wind (Ashley) DVD
 One Ball of Fame 2 DVD
 Angels & Demons DVD
 King of the Kings (Jack - Jude Law)
 Renewed Beauty (Alix - Robert Downey Jr.)
 Hot Cow Beauty (CCTV-6)
 Dream Flower (Satie) (CCTV-6)
 Angel's Egg (a gunshot too - played by the city's original monk) (CCTV-6)
 The big return of the game (small spot) 2005 movie channel broadcast
 Carpenter's Story (Charles)
 Brave Bollywood
 Love Pizza (Joy) (CCTV-6)
 Elizabeth Town (CCTV-6)
 Atlantis Empire (CCTV-6)
 The Sword (CCTV-6)
 Wild Nature (CCTV-6)
 The Adventures of the Heroes (CCTV-6)
 Pirates of the Caribbean 3 preview version
 Luo Jialun (Wang Lihong)
 Moore Manor Sea Monster Treasure Ruiqi
 100,000 cold jokes (movie) protagonist of the end of the world
 Detective Conan: Zero The Enforcer (Kudou Shinichi)(Chinese mainland editor)

Broadcast 
 The First Chaos in History (Beijing Art and Culture Broadcasting FM87.6, 22:30 every night, "Broadcast Theater")
 Those Things in the Ming Dynasty (Beijing Art and Culture Broadcasting FM87.6)
 Talking the World (Beijing Art Broadcasting FM87.6, 22:00 every night)

Online games 
 Glorious Zhen·Three Kingdoms Warriors OL (Zhuge Liang , Cao Yu)
 Japan Glory Three Kingdoms OL (Zhuge Liang)
 Warhammer ol (dark elf)
 Yin and Yang system sound
 Love and Producer (Bai Qi)
 《江湖大梦》 胡铁花
 Chu Liuxiang Hu Tiehua
 For All Time (Ayn)

Webcast drama 
 Yin and Yang Shijiao
 Matsuda of "Chao Wen Dao"
 Kyle of "After the Stage"
 The Three Eagles of "A Gathering Together"
 The martial art of "FAinRO"
 Juvenile notice narration
 驿路 North End
 Don't Die news anchor
 The supply of "eight unicorns"
 Tang Wei in The Peach Blossoms
 Kite Legend preview narration
 The son of "The Man of the Mountain"
 Shadow Director of Westerly Radio
 Don't let him receive the letter Father
 Step by step startling of the eight brothers 1, 2, unfinished
 Luping 1-15 of Crossing Destiny Cross
 Death Note night God's notice, one end
 Raslin's preview of "The Apple of Sodom", 2 words, unfinished
 Father Yasen Garda of "The Sacrifice of Dionysus" 1-7 words + three notices
 The fox is how to make it cat king 1 - x words + extra video dubbing
 Abe Seimei of "Yin and Yang", the end of the three children, 蟾蜍, 白比丘尼
 Saga of the Athena Violent Cooking Room's Devil's Possession
 Soul preview (original Jiangnan)
 The soul of "The Soul" (original Jiangnan)
 Jianwang three game video series "Jiangying Shenfu" first episode Mingtong (Li Lie)
 The fox of the natural fox
 Kaifeng Qi Tan white chrysanthemum
 Blind Demonstration-derived radio drama Xue Yang
 Seeing Huan Li Yanghong, Li Yanqiu
 Sha Po Lang, Gu Yun
 Undead, Yan Hao

Web drama 
 Xianjian Inn Long You (Chen Ximing)

Stand-alone game 
 The Legend of the Sword and the Chivalrous Man, Kui Zhao, Xia Yuanchen, Yu Feng
 The Legend of the Sword and the Chivalrous Man [Continental Edition] Long You [2]
 The Legend of the Sword and the Chivalrous Biography 
 Xuanyuan Jianlu Feng Tianling
 The Legend of the Sword and the Chivalrous Six
 Love and Producer
 For All Time
The Tale of Food 食物语, Fo Tiao Qiang, Lianhua Xue Ya, Ba Wang Bie Ji

Network animation 
 Funny comic day and the end of the world host
 The Spirit of Chess is
 She and her cat
 Warring States Warriors II Hehe Sun City
 Maori Kogoro, "Detective Conan - Assassin in Pupil"
 The game "Devil City" - the moonlight night, the song of the Richter, the library grandfather
 Brown Sugar Gourd Chef
 Bartender Bartender
 Saint Seiya CR Chinese dubbing preview Shaka

COS dubbing 
 Dynasty Warriors 4COSPLAY Jin Ge Iron Horse dominates the world narration, Zhang Jiao, Liu Bei , Zhuge Liang
 Seven Heroes and Five Meanings - Merry World COSPLAY Narration
 Steel refining COS drama "Little Red Riding Hood" Roy Marstein
 [Loyalty Hall] COS "Where is the sea" Beihai Dragon King / Dragon Three Princes / Turtles
 [Loyalty Hall] COS "Reverse Water Cold" 戚少商

Interview 
 Sound Creation Alliance Voice 1
 09.12.16 Listening to the radio - Interview with Ajie
 [Decision 5th Anniversary] [Communication Network with these events series interview] [Phase 1] - Ajie Maggie Interview
 [All Excellent Voices] Sea Elections Review Special Program "When the Sea Election is in progress [Phase 2] 2011/02/27
 [All excellent sound] top show Beijing landing game commentary special program 2011/04/24
 Guangzhou Youth Magazine "Win the Future" Interview: lively in front of the scene, behind the scenes, the "sound" of the "sound" Jun "sound" live 2011/05/16
 Anhui TV "Beauty World" premiere ceremony (111,123), November 10 recording and Jiang Guangtao , quarter Guanlin , Joe poetic language , Zhang Limin jointly participate

Singing 
 Love of the Empty Chinese version
 Unfinished Poetry
 DESTINY ~ fate ~ Ajie & Xiaoyun
 Beijing One Night
 The mortal
 The Lord of the Rings
 a long distance away
 Spring, Come and Come
 Mudanjiang
 itch
 And try the world - Ajie, HITA
 Song Tang Night Sing
 Devil City, the night of the night, ED- "I am the wind"
 Imperial Chinese corps
 胧月夜～りり
 Yin and Yang division radio wave brain wash
 The musical " Injury " adapted "3Q injury" cos Tencent
 I have always been obsessed with 甄嬛 甄嬛 甄嬛 [ [ [ft.HITA]
 The same way, ‧ remember Mei Zhuang Wen Shichu [Ft.HITA]
 Yue Ruo Liu Jin (the theme song of the radio drama " Sha Po Lang ")

Other 
 The master of the musical " Injury "
 Ajie brand iron pot
 Zichuan report system sound
 UC audio clips
 Sound system sound
 Alliance Voice System Sound
 Beijing Capital Life Radio's Podcast Show on March 20 - Ajie Maggie Album
 Beijing Ka Cool TV "very happy" Wang Fan
 The special program "World Exploration" commentary
 Feng Hua Lu Li Bai
 Jinjiang Literature City produced anthropomorphic broadcast small theater officially launched! [The first bomb: two or three things of the big brother and the second brother] - Big Brother (love channel)
 Full-time master pseudo movie trailer, Ye Yexiu / Ye Qiu
 VOCALOID4 sound library "Yuezheng Longya" sound source

References

1978 births
Chinese male voice actors
Living people